DeRidder Homestead is a historic home located at Easton in Washington County, New York.  It consists of a two-story, three by two bay, brick main block with a one-story rear wing. The earliest part of the house dates to about 1735. Also on the property is a barn and several outbuildings.

It was listed on the National Register of Historic Places in 1974.

References

Houses on the National Register of Historic Places in New York (state)
Federal architecture in New York (state)
Houses completed in 1735
Houses in Washington County, New York
National Register of Historic Places in Washington County, New York